Ambrose Lethbridge  (20 January 1875 – 13 March 1962) was a British Anglican priest who served as Provost of St Mary's Cathedral, Glasgow from 1917 until 1926.

Lethbridge was born in Punjab, British India, and attended Keble College, Oxford. He died in Peterborough, Northamptonshire, aged 87.

References

Provosts of St Mary's Cathedral, Glasgow
1875 births
1962 deaths
Alumni of Keble College, Oxford